The Susitna River is a  long river in the Southcentral Alaska. It is the 15th largest river in the United States, ranked by average discharge volume at its mouth. The river stretches from the Susitna Glacier to Cook Inlet's Knik Arm.

Etymology and history 
The Susitna River was named by the Dena'ina Alaska Native people meaning "sandy river". The river appears to have been first explored by outsiders in 1834 by a "Creole [Indian] named Malakov" and the name may have been obtained by the Russians at that time, recorded by the Russia Hydrography Department on chart 1378 dated 1847 as  "Sushitna River". The present spelling of the name has evolved due to euphemistic reasons. The 1890 census reported that Susitna Village on the east bank of the river had 146 Kenai Natives and 27 houses.

Description

There are several rivers flowing into the Susitna River including East Fork Susitna River and West Fork Susitna River. The Little Susitna River is a separate river system which flows into the Cook Inlet on the other side of Susitna Flats.

The Susitna along with the Matanuska River, drains the broad Matanuska-Susitna Valley south of the Alaska Range.

It rises in the Susitna Glacier on Mount Hayes in the Alaska Range near . It flows in winding course generally southwest to Curry, then south, along the west side of the Talkeetna Mountains, past Talkeetna, Chulitna River, and Susitna, and drains into Cook Inlet approximately 25 miles (40 km) west of Anchorage. 

It receives the Yentna River from the northwest approximately 5 miles (8 km) north of Susitna. It is navigable to 85 mile (137 km) upstream from its mouth to Talkeetna. Valdez Creek, notable for its 1903 gold mining, is one of the small headwater tributaries of Susitna River.

The Susitna River is one of Southcentral Alaska's premier sport fishing streams, with significant runs of Chinook and Coho salmon, along with resident grayling, burbot, and rainbow trout. Located within a roadless area, access to the river is difficult and is made usually by power boat or by floatplane. 

Matanuska-Susitna Borough owns much of the land along the Susitna and Deshka Rivers. The impacts of summer recreational use and tourists have caused loss of riparian vegetation and bank erosion along the Deshka River's lower reaches, which has been partially remedied through a restoration project in the summer of 2002. However, the borough currently lacks either regulations to prevent further damage or the means to enforce such regulations.

Geology
The Susitna Basin, is located about 50 miles from Anchorage. As of a 2018 USGS assessment, it probably contains technically recoverable oil and gas resources using current technology—in rocks of Tertiary age (about 66 to 2.6 million years old)

Location
Susitna River is on the North side of Cook Inlet  North-East of North Foreland.

The channels above the mouth are said to change frequently in the spring and early summer.

Mail is delivered to both settlements twice monthly by airplane from Anchorage, Alaska.

Susitna Flats lie between big Susitna River and Little Susitna River and to the East of the latter.

The depths offshore and in the approach to Little Susitna River are subject to drastic and continual change.

Bridges
The Susitna River Bridge is a railroad bridge of the Alaska Railroad in south-central Alaska. It spans the Susitna River on the eastern edge of Denali State Park near Gold Creek. The bridge is on the National Register of Historic Places.

Construction of the bridge took place from October 1920 to February 1921. The span is 503 ft., with a height of 71 ft. in the center; the steel weighs 2,000 tons, and rests on two concrete piers, each 50 ft. high and 70 x 40 ft. in cross-section, and each containing 1,500 cubic yards of concrete. The location was chosen, just downstream of a curve, after observing the pattern of ice jams through the preceding three years.

It is bridged by the George Parks Highway south of Talkeetna.  South of that point, there are no other bridges, which contributes to the isolation of southwest Alaska.

Ice
Between approximately October 19 and November 14 the Susitna River ices or freezes over for the winter.
 Between April 12 and May 10 the ice breaks-up for the summer.

Tributaries
East Fork Susitna River
West Fork Susitna River
Yentna River
Deshka River
Talkeetna River
Chulitna River
Oshetna River
Tyone River
Maclaren River

See also
List of rivers of Alaska

References

External links

National Oceanic and Atmospheric Administration

Rivers of Matanuska-Susitna Borough, Alaska
Rivers of Alaska
Denaʼina